The 2006 Cleveland Indians season was the 106th season for the franchise. It began with the Cleveland Indians attempting to win the AL Central and make the playoffs. The Indians finished with a mediocre 78-84 record and missed the playoffs. It was the final season before Progressive bought the naming rights to then-Jacobs Field.

Offseason 
 December 7, 2005: Paul Byrd was signed as a free agent with the Cleveland Indians.
 January 6, 2006: Todd Hollandsworth was signed as a free agent with the Cleveland Indians.

Regular season 
On September 2, 2006, Kevin Kouzmanoff became the 23rd Major Leaguer to hit a home run in his first Major League at bat, the 12th American Leaguer to do so, and the second of 2006 (along with Adam Wainwright of the St. Louis Cardinals). He was only the third player to have the home run be a grand slam.
Kouzmanoff is only one of two players in Major League Baseball history to hit a grand slam on his first pitch ever seen in the Major Leagues, along with Daniel Nava. The pitcher who gave up the hit was Edinson Vólquez.

Season standings

Record vs. opponents

Transactions 
 April 7, 2006: Brandon Phillips was traded by the Cleveland Indians to the Cincinnati Reds for a player to be named later. The Cincinnati Reds sent Jeff Stevens (minors) (June 13, 2006) to the Cleveland Indians to complete the trade.
 July 20, 2006: Bob Wickman was traded by the Cleveland Indians to the Atlanta Braves for Max Ramirez (minors).
 July 26, 2006: Ben Broussard was traded by the Cleveland Indians with cash to the Seattle Mariners for a player to be named later and Shin-Soo Choo. The Seattle Mariners sent Shawn Nottingham (minors) (August 24, 2006) to the Cleveland Indians to complete the trade.
 August 9, 2006: Todd Hollandsworth was purchased by the Cincinnati Reds from the Cleveland Indians.

Roster

Game log 

|- bgcolor="#ffbbbb"
| 1 || April 2 || @ White Sox || 10 – 4 || McCarthy (1-0) || Cabrera (0-1) || || 38,802 || 0-1
|- bgcolor="#bbffbb"
| 2 || April 4 || @ White Sox || 8 – 2 || Westbrook (1-0) || García (0-1) || || 37,591 || 1-1
|- bgcolor="#bbffbb"
| 3 || April 5 || @ White Sox || 4 – 3 || Graves (1-0) || Cotts (0-1) || Wickman (1) || 33,586 || 2-1
|- bgcolor="#bbffbb"
| 4 || April 7 || Twins || 11 – 6 || Byrd (1-0) || Lohse (0-1) || || 42,445 || 3-1
|- bgcolor="#bbffbb"
| 5 || April 8 || Twins || 3 – 0 || Johnson (1-0) || Baker (0-1) || Wickman (2) || 25,107 || 4-1
|- bgcolor="#bbffbb"
| 6 || April 9 || Twins || 3 – 2 || Westbrook (2-0) || Santana (0-2) || Wickman (3) || 23,311 || 5-1
|- bgcolor="#bbffbb"
| 7 || April 11 || Mariners || 9 – 5 || Lee (1-0) || Washburn (1-1) || || 17,559 || 6-1
|- bgcolor="#ffbbbb"
| 8 || April 12 || Mariners || 11 – 9 || Woods (1-0) || Byrd (1-1) || Guardado (1) || 14,773 || 6-2
|- bgcolor="#ffbbbb"
| 9 || April 13 || Mariners || 9 – 5 || Mateo (1-0) || Sauerbeck (0-1) || Putz (2) || 24,638 || 6-3
|- bgcolor="#ffbbbb"
| 10 || April 14 || @ Tigers || 5 – 1 || Rogers (2-1) || Westbrook (2-1) || || 27,358 || 6-4
|- bgcolor="#bbffbb"
| 11 || April 15 || @ Tigers || 7 – 2 || Carmona (1-0) || Bonderman (1-2) || || 30,107 || 7-4
|- bgcolor="#ffbbbb"
| 12 || April 16 || @ Tigers || 1 – 0 || Maroth (2-0) || Lee (1-1) || Rodney (3) || 14,303 || 7-5
|- bgcolor="#bbffbb"
| 13 || April 17 || @ Tigers || 10 – 2 || Byrd (2-1) || Robertson (1-2) || || 19,126 || 8-5
|- bgcolor="#bbffbb"
| 14 || April 18 || @ Orioles || 15 – 1 || Johnson (2-0) || Chen (0-2) || || 17,354 || 9-5
|- bgcolor="#ffbbbb"
| 15 || April 19 || @ Orioles || 18 – 9 || Halama (1-0) || Westbrook (2-2) || || 19,510 || 9-6
|- bgcolor="#ffbbbb"
| 16 || April 20 || @ Orioles || 9 – 4 || Bédard (4-0) || Carmona (1-1) || || 22,031 || 9-7
|- bgcolor="#bbffbb"
| 17 || April 21 || @ Royals || 6 – 5 || Graves (2-0) || Dessens (1-1) || Wickman (4) || 16,791 || 10-7
|- bgcolor="#ffbbbb"
| 18 || April 22 || @ Royals || 11 – 5 || Wood (2-0) || Byrd (2-2) || || 19,645 || 10-8
|- bgcolor="#ffbbbb"
| 19 || April 23 || @ Royals || 5 – 1 || Affeldt (1-2) || Johnson (2-1) || || 12,194 || 10-9
|- bgcolor="#ffbbbb"
| 20 || April 25 || Red Sox || 8 – 6 || Foulke (1-1) || Mota (0-1) || Papelbon (9) || 18,438 || 10-10
|- bgcolor="#bbffbb"
| 21 || April 26 || Red Sox || 7 – 1 || Lee (2-1) || Wakefield (1-4) || || 21,575 || 11-10
|- bgcolor="#bbffbb"
| 22 || April 27 || Red Sox || 15 – 3 || Byrd (3-2) || Beckett (3-1) || || 26,952 || 12-10
|- bgcolor="#bbffbb"
| 23 || April 28 || Rangers || 7 – 6 || Davis (1-0) || Bauer (1-1) || Wickman (5) || 22,106 ||13-10
|- bgcolor="#ffbbbb"
| 24 || April 29 || Rangers || 7 – 5 || Millwood (2-2) || Carmona (1-2) || Otsuka (1) || 37,496 || 13-11
|- bgcolor="#ffbbbb"
| 25 || April 30 || Rangers || 8 – 4 || Padilla (3-1) || Davis (1-1) || || 22,989 || 13-12

|- bgcolor="#ffbbbb"
| 26 || May 1 || White Sox || 8 – 6 || Vázquez (3-1) || Lee (2-2) || Jenks (8) || 17,845 || 13-13
|- bgcolor="#bbffbb"
| 27 || May 2 || White Sox || 7 – 1 || Sabathia (1-0) || Buehrle (3-2) || || 22,630 || 14-13
|- bgcolor="#bbffbb"
| 28 || May 3 || @ Athletics || 14 – 3 || Byrd (4-2) || Haren (1-3) || || 18,248 || 15-13
|- bgcolor="#ffbbbb"
| 29 || May 4 || @ Athletics || 12 – 4 || Saarloos (1-0) || Johnson (2-2) || Gaudin (1) || 14,695 || 15-14
|- bgcolor="#bbffbb"
| 30 || May 5 || @ Mariners || 9 – 4 || Westbrook (3-2) || Soriano (0-1) || || 32,998 || 16-14
|- bgcolor="#ffbbbb"
| 31 || May 6 || @ Mariners || 4 – 1 || Piñeiro (4-2) || Lee (2-3) || Putz (3) || 28,672 || 16-15
|- bgcolor="#bbffbb"
| 32 || May 7 || @ Mariners || 2 – 0 || Sabathia (2-0) || Washburn (2-5) || Wickman (6) || 35,562 || 17-15
|- bgcolor="#ffbbbb"
| 33 || May 8 || @ Royals || 4 – 3 || Wood (3-0) || Byrd (4-3) || Burgos (5) || 9,029 || 17-16
|- bgcolor="#ffbbbb"
| 34 || May 9 || @ Royals || 10 – 7 || Peralta (1-0) || Graves (2-1) || || 14,784 || 17-17
|- bgcolor="#ffbbbb"
| 35 || May 10 || @ Royals || 10 – 8 || Burgos (1-0) || Mota (0-2) || || 24,471 || 17-18
|- bgcolor="#ffbbbb"
| 36 || May 12 || Tigers || 5 – 4 || Rogers (6-2) || Lee (2-4) || Jones (8) || 23,588 || 17-19
|- bgcolor="#ffbbbb"
| 37 || May 13 || Tigers || 3 – 0 || Bonderman (4-2) || Sabathia (2-1) || Jones (9) || 24,051 || 17-20
|- bgcolor="#ffbbbb"
| 38 || May 14 || Tigers || 3 – 2 || Maroth (5-2) || Johnson (2-3) || Rodney (6) || 21,875 || 17-21
|- bgcolor="#bbffbb"
| 39 || May 16 || Royals || 6 – 4 || Davis (2-1) || Burgos (1-2) || || 15,399 || 18-21
|- bgcolor="#bbffbb"
| 40 || May 17 || Royals || 5 – 0 || Westbrook (4-2) || Affeldt (2-3) || || 15,064 || 19-21
|- bgcolor="#bbffbb"
| 41 || May 18 || Royals || 6 – 5 || Lee (3-4) || Hernández (1-3) || Wickman (7) || 24,184 || 20-21
|- bgcolor="#bbffbb"
| 42 || May 19 || Pirates || 4 – 1 || Sabathia (3-1) || Duke (2-5) || || 32,499 || 21-21
|- bgcolor="#ffbbbb"
| 43 || May 20 || Pirates || 9 – 6 || Snell (3-3) || Johnson (2-4) || Gonzalez (6) || 30,799 || 21-22
|- bgcolor="#bbffbb"
| 44 || May 21 || Pirates || 3 – 2  || Wickman (1-0) || Gonzalez (1-3) || || 31,589 || 22-22
|- bgcolor="#ffbbbb"
| 45 || May 23 || @ Twins || 6 – 5  || Nathan (2-0) || Mota (0-3) || || 19,334 || 22-23
|- bgcolor="#bbffbb"
| 46 || May 24 || @ Twins || 11 – 0 || Sabathia (4-1) || Radke (4-6) || || 22,789 || 23-23
|- bgcolor="#ffbbbb"
| 47 || May 26 || @ Tigers || 8 – 3 || Robertson (5-3) || Westbrook (4-3) || || 31,241 || 23-24
|- bgcolor="#ffbbbb"
| 48 || May 27 || @ Tigers || 3 – 1 || Verlander (7-3) || Byrd (4-4) || Jones (16) || 37,102 || 23-25
|- bgcolor="#bbffbb"
| 49 || May 28 || @ Tigers || 9 – 0 || Johnson (3-4) || Rogers (7-3) || || 37,908 || 24-25
|- bgcolor="#ffbbbb"
| 50 || May 29 || White Sox || 11 – 0 || Vázquez (6-3) || Lee (3-5) || || 31,803 || 24-26
|- bgcolor="#bbffbb"
| 51 || May 30 || White Sox || 4 – 3 || Sabathia (5-1) || Buehrle (6-3) || Wickman (8) || 20,944 || 25-26
|- bgcolor="#bbffbb"
| 52 || May 31 || White Sox || 5 – 0 || Westbrook (5-3) || García (7-3) || || 21,671 || 26-26

|- bgcolor="#bbffbb"
| 53 || June 1 || White Sox || 12 – 8 || Cabrera (1-1) || Thornton (0-1) || || 20,846 || 27-26
|- bgcolor="#ffbbbb"
| 54 || June 2 || Angels || 10 – 3 || Weaver (2-0) || Johnson (3-5) || || 22,957 || 27-27
|- bgcolor="#bbffbb"
| 55 || June 3 || Angels || 14 – 2 || Lee (4-5) || Escobar (5-6) || || 23,769 || 28-27
|- bgcolor="#ffbbbb"
| 56 || June 4 || Angels || 14 – 2 || Lackey (4-3) || Sabathia (5-2) || || 19,148 || 28-28
|- bgcolor="#ffbbbb"
| 57 || June 6 || Athletics || 7 – 6 || Zito (6-3) || Betancourt (0-1) || Street (10) || 17,340 || 28-29
|- bgcolor="#bbffbb"
| 58 || June 7 || Athletics || 11 – 2 || Byrd (5-4) || Blanton (5-6) || || 20,311 || 29-29
|- bgcolor="#ffbbbb"
| 59 || June 8 || Athletics || 4 – 1 || Loaiza (1-3) || Johnson (3-6) || Street (11) || 21,099 || 29-30
|- bgcolor="#ffbbbb"
| 60 || June 9 || @ White Sox || 5 – 4 || Thornton (1-1) || Betancourt (0-2) || Jenks (18) || 33,909 || 29-31
|- bgcolor="#ffbbbb"
| 61 || June 10 || @ White Sox || 4 – 3  || Montero (1-0) || Wickman (1-1) || || 36,265 || 29-32
|- bgcolor="#bbffbb"
| 62 || June 11 || @ White Sox || 10 – 8 || Westbrook (6-3) || García (7-4) || Wickman (9) || 34,410 || 30-32
|- bgcolor="#ffbbbb"
| 63 || June 13 || @ Yankees || 1 – 0 || Wang (7-2) || Byrd (5-5) || Rivera (13) || 50,365 || 30-33
|- bgcolor="#ffbbbb"
| 64 || June 14 || @ Yankees || 6 – 1 || Johnson (8-5) || Johnson (3-7) || || 53,448 || 30-34
|- bgcolor="#bbffbb"
| 65 || June 15 || @ Yankees || 8 – 4 || Lee (5-5) || Mussina (8-3) || || 54,648 || 31-34
|- bgcolor="#ffbbbb"
| 66 || June 16 || @ Brewers || 6 – 4 || Capuano (7-4) || Sabathia (5-3) || Turnbow (20) || 33,178 || 31-35
|- bgcolor="#ffbbbb"
| 67 || June 17 || @ Brewers || 3 – 2 || Capellán (2-0) || Wickman (1-2) || || 42,069 || 31-36
|- bgcolor="#ffbbbb"
| 68 || June 18 || @ Brewers || 6 – 3 || Turnbow (4-3) || Betanourt (0-3) || || 43,391 || 31-37
|- bgcolor="#ffbbbb"
| 69 || June 19 || Cubs || 12 – 8 || Marshall (4-5) || Johnson (3-8) || || 26,769 || 31-38
|- bgcolor="#bbffbb"
| 70 || June 20 || Cubs || 4 – 2 || Lee (6-5) || Maddux (7-7) || Wickman (10) || 25,049 || 32-38
|- bgcolor="#ffbbbb"
| 71 || June 21 || Cubs || 9 – 2  || Zambrano (6-3) || Sabathia (5-4) || || 27,182 || 32-39
|- bgcolor="#ffbbbb"
| 72 || June 23 || Reds || 3 – 0 || Harang (8-5) || Westbrook (6-4) || || 32,927 || 32-40
|- bgcolor="#bbffbb"
| 73 || June 24 || Reds || 4 – 0 || Byrd (6-5) || Arroyo (9-4) || || 33,072 || 33-40
|- bgcolor="#ffbbbb"
| 74 || June 25 || Reds || 4 – 2 || Ramírez (3-6) || Sowers (0-1) || Coffey (6) || 33,139 || 33-41
|- bgcolor="#bbffbb"
| 75 || June 26 || @ Cardinals || 10 – 3 || Lee (7-5) || Marquis (9-6) || || 44,659 || 34-41
|- bgcolor="#bbffbb"
| 76 || June 27 || @ Cardinals || 3 – 1 || Sabathia (6-4) || Reyes (1-2) || Wickman (11) || 44,446 || 35-41
|- bgcolor="#ffbbbb"
| 77 || June 28 || @ Cardinals || 5 – 4 || Isringhausen (2-3) || Wickman (1-3) || || 44,628 || 35-42
|- bgcolor="#ffbbbb"
| 78 || June 30 || @ Reds || 9 – 8 || Mercker (1-1) || Wickman (1-4) || || 34,930 || 35-43

|- bgcolor="#bbffbb"
| 79 || July 1 || @ Reds || 12 – 7 || Lee (8-5) || Mays (0-1) || || 40,692 || 36-43
|- bgcolor="#bbffbb"
| 80 || July 2 || @ Reds || 6 – 3 || Mota (1-3) || Weathers (3-3) || Wickman (12) || 36,849 || 37-43
|- bgcolor="#bbffbb"
| 81 || July 3 || Yankees || 5 – 2 || Sowers (1-1) || Wang (8-4) || Wickman (13) || 42,706 || 38-43
|- bgcolor="#bbffbb"
| 82 || July 4 || Yankees || 19 – 1 || Westbrook (7-4) || Chacón (4-3) || || 29,638 || 39-43
|- bgcolor="#ffbbbb"
| 83 || July 5 || Yankees || 11 – 3 || Mussina (10-3) || Byrd (6-6) || || 31,265 || 39-44
|- bgcolor="#ffbbbb"
| 84 || July 6 || Yankees || 10 – 4 || Johnson (10-7) || Lee (8-6) || || 34,982 || 39-45
|- bgcolor="#bbffbb"
| 85 || July 7 || Orioles || 9 – 0 || Sabathia (7-4) || Benson (9-7) || || 27,110 || 40-45
|- bgcolor="#ffbbbb"
| 86 || July 8 || Orioles || 7 – 4 || Bédard (10-6) || Sowers (1-2) || Ray (21) || 28,902 || 40-46
|- bgcolor="#ffbbbb"
| 87 || July 9 || Orioles || 5 – 4 || Birkins (4-1) || Carmona (1-3) || Ray (22) || 26,452 || 40-47
|-
| colspan=9 style="background:#bbbbff"|All-Star Break
|- bgcolor="#bbffbb"
| 88 || July 13 || @ Twins || 6 – 4 || Lee (9-6) || Liriano (10-2) || Wickman (14) || 21,085 || 41-47
|- bgcolor="#ffbbbb"
| 89 || July 14 || @ Twins || 3 – 2  || Nathan (6-0) || Mujica (0-1) || || 21,279 || 41-48
|- bgcolor="#ffbbbb"
| 90 || July 15 || @ Twins || 6 – 2 || Santana (10-5) || Sabathia (7-5) || || 33,904 || 41-49
|- bgcolor="#ffbbbb"
| 91 || July 16 || @ Twins || 5 – 2 || Silva (5-9) || Sowers (1-3) || Nathan (16) || 31,838 || 41-50
|- bgcolor="#ffbbbb"
| 92 || July 17 || @ Angels || 10 – 5 || Moseley (1-0) || Westbrook (7-5) || || 43,921 || 41-51
|- bgcolor="#ffbbbb"
| 93 || July 18 || @ Angels || 7 – 5 || Saunders (1-0) || Lee (9-7) || Rodríguez (23) || 44,020 || 41-52
|- bgcolor="#bbffbb"
| 94 || July 19 || @ Angels || 6 – 4 || Byrd (7-6) || Lackey (8-6) || Wickman (15) || 43,744 || 42-52
|- bgcolor="#ffbbbb"
| 95 || July 21 || Twins || 14 – 6 || Reyes (2-0) || Sabathia (7-6) || || 29,695 || 42-53
|- bgcolor="#bbffbb"
| 96 || July 22 || Twins || 11 – 0 || Sowers (2-3) || Baker (3-6) || || 26,895 || 43-53
|- bgcolor="#ffbbbb"
| 97 || July 23 || Twins || 3 – 1 || Liriano (12-2) || Westbrook (7-6) || Nathan (19) || 25,889 || 43-54
|- bgcolor="#ffbbbb"
| 98 || July 24 || Tigers || 9 – 7 || Bonderman (11-4) || Lee (9-8) || Jones (26) || 19,045 || 43-55
|- bgcolor="#bbffbb"
| 99 || July 25 || Tigers || 12 – 7 || Davis (3-1) || Rogers (11-4) || || 28,085 || 44-55
|- bgcolor="#ffbbbb"
| 100 || July 26 || Tigers || 4 – 1 || Verlander (13-4) || Sabathia (7-7) || Jones (27) || 31,220 || 44-56
|- bgcolor="#bbffbb"
| 101 || July 28 || Mariners || 1 – 0 || Sowers (3-3) || Hernández (9-9) || || 25,045 || 45-56
|- bgcolor="#ffbbbb"
| 102 || July 29 || Mariners || 3 – 1 || Washburn (5-10) || Westbrook (7-7) || Putz (21) || 27,876 || 45-57
|- bgcolor="#ffbbbb"
| 103 || July 30 || Mariners || 7 – 3 || Woods (3-1) || Carmona (1-4) || Putz (22) || 23,146 || 45-58
|- bgcolor="#ffbbbb"
| 104 || July 31 || @ Red Sox || 9 – 8 || Snyder (3-2) || Carmona (1-5) || || 36,387 || 45-59

|- bgcolor="#bbffbb"
| 105 || August 1 || @ Red Sox || 6 – 3 || Sabathia (8-7) || Johnson (3-11) || || 36,328 || 46-59
|- bgcolor="#ffbbbb"
| 106 || August 2 || @ Red Sox || 6 – 5 || Papelbon (3-1) || Carmona (1-6) || || 36,022 || 46-60
|- bgcolor="#bbffbb"
| 107 || August 3 || @ Red Sox || 7 – 6 || Westbrook (8-7) || Beckett (13-6) || Davis (1) || 36,557 || 47-60
|- bgcolor="#ffbbbb"
| 108 || August 4 || @ Tigers || 7 – 6 || Colón (2-0) || Cabrera (1-2) || Jones (30) || 41,502 || 47-61
|- bgcolor="#ffbbbb"
| 109 || August 5 || @ Tigers || 4 – 3 || Zumaya (6-1) || Carmona (1-7) || || 43,015 || 47-62
|- bgcolor="#ffbbbb"
| 110 || August 6 || @ Tigers || 1 – 0 || Ledezma (2-1) || Sabathia (8-8) || Jones (31) || 39,178 || 47-63
|- bgcolor="#ffbbbb"
| 111 || August 8 || Angels || 5 – 4 || Donnelly (2-0) || Betancourt (0-4) || Rodríguez (28) || 23,293 || 47-64
|- bgcolor="#bbffbb"
| 112 || August 9 || Angels || 4 – 0 || Westbrook (9-7) || Lackey (10-8) || || 18,804 || 48-64
|- bgcolor="#bbffbb"
| 113 || August 10 || Angels || 14 – 2 || Lee (10-8) || Santana (12-6) || || 24,362 || 49-64
|- bgcolor="#bbffbb"
| 114 || August 11 || Royals || 4 – 3 || Cabrera (2-2) || Burgos (2-5) || || 30,929 || 50-64
|- bgcolor="#bbffbb"
| 115 || August 12 || Royals || 5 – 4 || Betancourt (1-4) || Nelson (0-1) || || 17,079 || 51-64
|- bgcolor="#bbffbb"
| 116 || August 12 || Royals || 6 – 5 || Sikorski (1-0) || Gobble (3-4) || || 28,842 || 52-64
|- bgcolor="#bbffbb"
| 117 || August 13 || Royals || 13 – 0 || Sowers (4-3) || Hudson (5-4) || || 25,251 || 53-64
|- bgcolor="#ffbbbb"
| 118 || August 15 || @ Twins || 4 – 1 || Santana (14-5) || Westbrook (9-8) || || 34,854 || 53-65
|- bgcolor="#ffbbbb"
| 119 || August 16 || @ Twins || 7 – 2 || Neshek (2-0) || Carmona (1-8) || || 42,328 || 53-66
|- bgcolor="#bbffbb"
| 120 || August 17 || @ Twins || 3 – 2 || Byrd (8-6) || Garza (0-2) || || 27,664 || 54-66
|- bgcolor="#ffbbbb"
| 121 || August 18 || @ Devil Rays || 6 – 5 || McClung (4-11) || Sikorski (1-1) || || 15,405 || 54-67
|- bgcolor="#bbffbb"
| 122 || August 19 || @ Devil Rays || 5 – 3 || Sowers (5-3) || Corcoran (4-5) || Mastny (1) || 17,865 || 55-67
|- bgcolor="#bbffbb"
| 123 || August 20 || @ Devil Rays || 9 – 4 || Westbrook (10-8) || Orvella (1-5) || || 19,938 || 56-67
|- bgcolor="#ffbbbb"
| 124 || August 22 || @ Royals || 5 – 2 || Pérez (1-1) || Lee (10-9) || Nelson (3) || 13,270 || 56-68
|- bgcolor="#bbffbb"
| 125 || August 23 || @ Royals || 15 – 13  || Betancourt (2-4) || Sisco (1-3) || Mastny (2) || 12,671 || 57-68
|- bgcolor="#bbffbb"
| 126 || August 24 || @ Royals || 8 – 4 || Sabathia (9-8) || Gobble (3-5) || || 13,098 || 58-68
|- bgcolor="#bbffbb"
| 127 || August 25 || Tigers || 4 – 2 || Sowers (6-3) || Bonderman (11-6) || Betancourt (1) || 33,416 || 59-68
|- bgcolor="#bbffbb"
| 128 || August 26 || Tigers || 8 – 5 || Westbrook (11-8) || Verlander (15-7) || Mastny (3) || 29,138 || 60-68
|- bgcolor="#ffbbbb"
| 129 || August 27 || Tigers || 7 – 1 || Rogers (14-6) || Lee (10-10) || || 28,342 || 60-69
|- bgcolor="#bbffbb"
| 130 || August 28 || Blue Jays || 6 – 4 || Byrd (9-6) || Burnett (6-6) || Mastny (4) || 19,623 || 61-69
|- bgcolor="#bbffbb"
| 131 || August 29 || Blue Jays || 5 – 2 || Sabathia (10-8) || League (0-2) || || 21,563 || 62-69
|- bgcolor="#bbffbb"
| 132 || August 30 || Blue Jays || 3 – 2  || Betancourt (3-4) || Ryan (1-2) || || 22,065 || 63-69

|- bgcolor="#bbffbb"
| 133 || September 1 || @ Rangers || 7 – 2 || Westbrook (12-8) || Padilla (13-9) || || 23,776 || 64-69
|- bgcolor="#bbffbb"
| 134 || September 2 || @ Rangers || 6 – 5 || Lee (11-10) || Vólquez (1-4) || Mastny (5) || 40,222 || 65-69
|- bgcolor="#ffbbbb"
| 135 || September 3 || @ Rangers || 5 – 2 || Millwood (14-9) || Byrd (9-7) || Otsuka (30) || 19,667 || 65-70
|- bgcolor="#ffbbbb"
| 136 || September 4 || @ Blue Jays || 4 – 3 || League (1-2) || Sabathia (10-9) || Ryan (30) || 27,864 || 65-71
|- bgcolor="#bbffbb"
| 137 || September 5 || @ Blue Jays || 7 – 2 || Sowers (7-3) || Accardo (1-1) || || 18,517 || 66-71
|- bgcolor="#ffbbbb"
| 138 || September 6 || @ Blue Jays || 3 – 2 || Lilly (12-12) || Westbrook (12-9) || Ryan (31) || 20,406 || 66-72
|- bgcolor="#bbffbb"
| 139 || September 7 || @ White Sox || 9 – 1 || Lee (12-10) || Buehrle (12-12) || || 34,671 || 67-72
|- bgcolor="#ffbbbb"
| 140 || September 8 || @ White Sox || 7 – 6 || Thornton (5-2) || Mastny (0-1) || || 37,188 || 67-73
|- bgcolor="#ffbbbb"
| 141 || September 9 || @ White Sox || 10 – 8 || Garland (17-4) || Carmona (1-9) || Thornton (2) || 38,422 || 67-74
|- bgcolor="#bbffbb"
| 142 || September 10 || @ White Sox || 5 – 2 || Sabathia (11-9) || McCarthy (3-7) || || 37,723 || 68-74
|- bgcolor="#ffbbbb"
| 143 || September 12 || Royals || 5 – 3 || Hernández (6-9) || Sowers (7-4) || Nelson (7) || 18,883 || 68-75
|- bgcolor="#ffbbbb"
| 144 || September 13 || Royals || 6 – 2 || de la Rosa (3-2) || Westbrook (12-10) || || 20,089 || 68-76
|- bgcolor="#ffbbbb"
| 145 || September 14 || Twins || 9 – 4 || Crain (4-5) || Davis (3-2) || || 21,424 || 68-77
|- bgcolor="#bbffbb"
| 146 || September 15 || Twins || 5 – 4  || Cabrera (3-2) || Neshek (4-2) || || 32,473 || 69-77
|- bgcolor="#ffbbbb"
| 147 || September 16 || Twins || 4 – 1 || Silva (10-13) || Sabathia (11-10) || Nathan (33) || 26,757 || 69-78
|- bgcolor="#ffbbbb"
| 148 || September 17 || Twins || 6 – 1 || Baker (5-8) || Byrd (9-8) || Guerrier (1) || 20,324 || 69-79
|- bgcolor="#bbffbb"
| 149 || September 18 || @ Athletics || 7 – 2 || Westbrook (13-10) || Haren (14-12) || || 17,352 || 70-79
|- bgcolor="#ffbbbb"
| 150 || September 19 || @ Athletics || 7 – 3 || Gaudin (2-2) || Lee (12-11) || || 15,866 || 70-80
|- bgcolor="#ffbbbb"
| 151 || September 20 || @ Athletics || 4 – 3 || Loaiza (11-8) || Cabrera (3-3) || Street (35) || 25,131 || 70-81
|- bgcolor="#ffbbbb"
| 152 || September 21 || @ Athletics || 7 – 4 || Gaudin (3-2) || Sabathia (11-11) || Street (36) || 20,452 || 70-82
|- bgcolor="#ffbbbb"
| 153 || September 22 || @ Rangers || 12 – 4 || Eaton (7-4) || Byrd (9-9) || || 26,284 || 70-83
|- bgcolor="#bbffbb"
| 154 || September 23 || @ Rangers || 6 – 3 || Miller (1-0) || Padilla (14-10) || Betancourt (2) || 38,351 || 71-83
|- bgcolor="#bbffbb"
| 155 || September 24 || @ Rangers || 11 – 6 || Westbrook (14-10) || Millwood (16-11) || || 36,617 || 72-83
|- bgcolor="#bbffbb"
| 156 || September 25 || White Sox || 14 – 1 || Lee (13-11) || Garland (17-7) || || 15,913 || 73-83
|- bgcolor="#bbffbb"
| 157 || September 26 || White Sox || 6 – 0 || Sabathia (12-11) || Vázquez (11-11) || || 16,080 || 74-83
|- bgcolor="#ffbbbb"
| 158 || September 27 || White Sox || 2 – 1  || McCarthy (4-7) || Carmona (1-10) || Haeger (1) || 16,404 || 74-84
|- bgcolor="#bbffbb"
| 159 || September 28 || Devil Rays || 5 – 4 || Byrd (10-9) || Lugo (2-4) || Betancourt (3) || 14,503 || 75-84
|- bgcolor="#bbffbb"
| 160 || September 29 || Devil Rays || 2 – 1 || Sikorski (2-1) || Miceli (1-2) || || 19,983 || 76-84
|- bgcolor="#bbffbb"
| 161 || September 30 || Devil Rays || 6 – 1 || Westbrook (15-10) || Seo (1-8) || || 17,562 || 77-84
|- bgcolor="#bbffbb"
| 162 || October 1 || Devil Rays || 6 – 3 || Lee (14-11) || Hammel (0-6) || || 22,079 || 78-84

Player stats

Batting 
Note: G = Games played; AB = At bats; R = Runs scored; H = Hits; 2B = Doubles; 3B = Triples; HR = Home runs; RBI = Runs batted in; AVG = Batting average; SB = Stolen bases

Pitching 
Note: W = Wins; L = Losses; ERA = Earned run average; G = Games pitched; GS = Games started; SV = Saves; IP = Innings pitched; H = Hits allowed; R = Runs allowed; ER = Earned runs allowed; BB = Walks allowed; K = Strikeouts

Minor league affiliates

References 

 2006 Cleveland Indians season at Baseball Reference

External links 

Cleveland Indians
Cleveland Guardians seasons
Cleve